Gunnar Broberg (5 September 1942 – 30 April 2022) was since 1990 Professor in History of Science and Ideas at Lund University, Sweden. Among other writings, Prof. Broberg has written about the compulsory sterilization activities in Sweden and about the scientist Carl Linnaeus. In 2005 he was elected Chair of the Royal Humanistic Scientific Society in Lund (Kungliga Humanistiska Vetenskapssamfundet i Lund). He was the editor of the book Gyllene äpplen (Golden apples), which  won the August Prize (Augustpriset) in 1992.

English bibliography 
 Eugenics and the Welfare State: Sterilization Policy in Denmark, Sweden, Norway, and Finland, Michigan State University Press: 1996 (with Nils Roll-Hansen).

Swedish bibliography 
 Järven, filfrassen, frossaren, 1971.
 Homo sapiens L, 1975.
 Brunögd, lätt, hastig, gjorde allting promt, 1978.
 Linnéminnen i Uppsala, 1982.
 Bilden av naturen, 1983.
 Nordström och hans skola, 1983.
 Oönskade i folkhemmet, 1991 (with Mattias Tydén).
 Gyllene äpplen, 1992.
 Statlig rasforskning, 1995.
 När svensk historia blev en världsnyhet, 1999 (with Mattias Tydén).
 Kattens historia, 2004.
 Tsunamin i Lissabon',' 2005.
 Carl von Linné, 2006.
 Nattens historia. Nordiskt mörker och ljus under tusen år, 2016
 Mannen som ordnade naturen: En biografi över Carl von Linné'', 2019

References 

1942 births
Living people
Academic staff of Lund University
August Prize winners